Intikancha (Quechua inti sun, kancha enclosure, enclosed place, yard, a frame, or wall that encloses, "sun yard", Hispanicized spelling Inticancha) is a mountain with an archaeological site of the same name in the Andes of Peru, about  high. It is located in the Puno Region, Lampa Province, Nicasio District, and in the San Román Province, Juliaca District.

The archaeological site of Intikancha was declared a National Cultural Heritage by Resolución Directoral Nacional No. 79. It lies south of the mountain and archaeological site of Pukarani.

References

Mountains of Peru
Mountains of Puno Region
Archaeological sites in Peru
Archaeological sites in Puno Region